Števan (Štefan) Smodiš (born 1758) was a Slovene Lutheran priest and writer.

He was born in Liszó, Somogy (today Zala county). His parents had migrated from the Slovene March (Slovenska okroglina, today Prekmurje). He worked as a teacher in Nemescsó. His ordination as a curate was on March 24, 1787 in Puconci and by 1792 he was working in Hodoš.

On July 25, 1792, he arrived in Bodonci. The date of his death is unknown or uncertain. He wrote hymns and a sermon in the Prekmurje dialect.

Literature 
 Evangeličanska cerkvena občina Bodonci
 Vili Kerčmar: Evangeličanska cerkev na Slovenskem, Murska Sobota 1995.

See also 
 List of Slovene writers and poets in Hungary

Slovenian writers and poets in Hungary
Slovenian Lutheran clergy
1758 births
Year of death missing